Money & Muscle is the third and final full-length studio album by American hip hop group The Click. It was released on September 25, 2001, through Sick Wid It/Jive Records. Production was handled by Bosko, DJ Fingazz, Rick Rock, Studio Ton, Ant Banks, Bink! and Tone Capone. It features guest appearances from Birdman, Bosko, Levitti and WC. The album peaked at number 99 on the Billboard 200 and number 23 on the Top R&B/Hip-Hop Albums in the United States. Along with the single, a music video was released for the song "Say Dat Den".

Track listing 

Sample credits
Track 5 contains a sample from "Questions" performed by Tech N9ne
Track 8 contains a portion of "Son of a Gun" performed by Silver Convention
Track 10 contains a sample from "Hot Ones Echo Thru the Ghetto" performed by The Click and a sample from "Mouthpiece" performed by E-40

Chart history

References

External links 

2001 albums
E-40 albums
B-Legit albums
Jive Records albums
Sick Wid It Records albums
Albums produced by Ant Banks
Albums produced by Rick Rock
Albums produced by Studio Ton
Albums produced by Bink (record producer)